The St. Nicholas Chapel is a historic Russian Orthodox church in Pedro Bay, Alaska, United States, that was built in 1890.

It is a  building with an extension at its altar end.  It has log walls.  In 1973, it was in quite good condition and appeared unaltered from its original 1890 construction.

The building was listed on the National Register of Historic Places in 1980.

References 

Churches completed in 1890
Churches on the National Register of Historic Places in Alaska
Russian Orthodox church buildings in Alaska
Buildings and structures on the National Register of Historic Places in Lake and Peninsula Borough, Alaska
Log buildings and structures on the National Register of Historic Places in Alaska